J.M. (Mike) Hayes is an American author of mystery novels.

Hayes was born and raised in central Kansas, graduated from Wichita State University and did post graduate work at the University of Arizona.

Hayes lives in Tucson, Arizona with his wife, Barbara.

Works
His first novel, The Grey Pilgrim follows fictional characters through a what-if version of 1940s Arizona history.  Originally published by Walker and Company in 1990, it was re-issued by Poisoned Pen Press in Trade Paperback in 2000.

The Grey Pilgrim (1990), 
Mad Dog & Englishman  (2000)
Prairie Gothic  (2003) The Best Novels You've Never Read, New York Magazine, 2007
Plains Crazy  (2004) Starred review, Booklist
Broken Heartland  (2007)
Server Down   (2009) Starred review, and one of five best mysteries of 2009, Library Journal
English Lessons   (2011)
"The Spirit and the Skull" (2014) (historical mystery set in Prehistoric Alaska) Starred review, Booklist

References

External links
J. M. Hayes home page
Sister's In Crime
Poisoned Pen Press
The Great Manhattan Mystery Conclave
http://www.nymag.com/arts/books/features/2007/32390/index2.html
http://www.poisonedpenpress.com/plains-crazy/
http/www.librarything.com/work/8333439

American crime writers
American male novelists
American mystery writers
American thriller writers
Writers of historical mysteries
Writers of fiction set in prehistoric times
Living people
University of Arizona alumni
Wichita State University alumni
Year of birth missing (living people)